Ghost is an album by American progressive rock band Crack the Sky.

Track listing

Personnel

The band
John Palumbo – Lead vocals, guitar, synthesizer
Rick Witkowski – Guitar
Bobby Hird – Guitar
Carey Ziegler – Bass guitar
Tracey Worsman – Drums
Glenn Workman – Keyboards, piano

2001 albums
Crack the Sky albums